The Philippine Air Force (PAF) is the aerial warfare service branch of the Armed Forces of the Philippines. Initially formed as part of the Philippine Army (Philippine Army Air Corps), the PAF is responsible for both defending the Philippine airspace, and conducting aerial operations throughout the Philippines, such as close air support operations, combat air patrols, aerial reconnaissance missions, airlift operations, helicopter tactical operations and aerial humanitarian operations. The PAF is headquartered at the Villamor Air Base in Pasay, and is headed by the Chief of the Air Force, who also serves as the branch's highest-ranking military officer.

History

Philippine Commonwealth and Independence

Early years and World War II
The forerunners of the Philippine Air Force was the Philippine Militia, otherwise known as Philippine National Guard (PNG). On March 17, 1917, Senate President Manuel L. Quezon enacted a bill (Militia Act 2715) for the creation of the Philippine Militia. It was enacted in anticipation that there would be an outbreak of hostilities between United States and Germany.

By the end of the First World War, the US Army and Navy began selling aircraft and equipment to the Philippine Militia Commission. The Commission then hired the services of the Curtiss Flying School to provide flight training to 33 students at Camp Claudio, Parañaque.

The early aviation unit was, however, still lacking enough knowledge and equipment to be considered as an air force and was then limited only to air transport duties. On January 2, 1935, Philippine Military Aviation was activated when the 10th Congress passed Commonwealth Act 1494 that provided for the organization of the Philippine Constabulary Air Corps (PCAC). PCAC was renamed the Philippine Army Air Corps (PAAC) in 1936. It started with only three planes on its inventory. In 1941, PAAC had a total of 54 aircraft including pursuit (fighters) light bombers, reconnaissance aircraft, light transport and trainers. They later engaged the Japanese when they invaded the Philippines in 1941–42, and were reformed in 1945 after the country's liberation.

Post-WWII and AFP restructuring

The PAF became a separate military service on July 1, 1947, when President Manuel Roxas issued Executive Order No. 94.  This order created the Philippine Naval Patrol and the Air Force as equal branches of the Philippine Army and the Philippine Constabulary under the now Armed Forces of the Philippines becoming Southeast Asia's third air force as a result.

The main aircraft type in the earlier era of the PAF was the P-51 Mustang, flown from 1947 to 1959. Ground attack missions were flown against various insurgent groups, with aircraft hit by ground fire but none shot down. In the 1950s the Mustang was used by the Blue Diamonds aerobatic display team. These would be replaced by the jet-powered North American F-86 Sabres in the late 1950s, assisted by Lockheed T-33 Shooting Star and Beechcraft T-34 Mentor trainers.

The PAF saw its first international action in the Congo under the UN peacekeeping mission in 1960.

Cold War Era

Marcos rule and People Power Revolution

When unrest arising from news of the Jabidah Massacre during Ferdinand Marcos' first presidential term triggered the Moro conflict in Mindanao and the establishment of the Moro National Liberation Front (MNLF) in 1972, the PAF was called upon to actively provide air support for the AFP campaign against MNLF in Central Mindanao, aside from doing the airlifting duties for troop movements from Manila and Cebu to the conflict zone. Traditional workhorses like the UH-1H choppers, L-20 “Beaver” aircraft, and C-47 gunships were mainly used in the campaign.

In the same decade, the PAF Self-Reliance Development Group, the forerunner of the Air Force Research and Development Center (AFRDC) was created. The Center enabled the PAF to create prototypes of aircraft aside on going into partnership with the private sector for some of its requirements.

In late 1977, the Philippine government purchased 35 secondhand U.S. Navy F-8Hs that were stored at Davis-Monthan AFB in Arizona. Twenty-five of them were refurbished by Vought and the remaining 10 were used for spare parts. As part of the deal, the U.S. would train Philippine pilots in using the TF-8A. They were mostly used for intercepting Soviet bombers. The F-8s were grounded in 1988 and were finally withdrawn from service in 1991 after they were badly damaged by the Mount Pinatubo eruption, and have since been offered for sale as scrap.

The PAF played a key part in ending the Marcos dictatorship during the 1986 People Power Revolution through the "Sotelo landing" of February 24, 1986.  Forces under Defense Minister Juan Ponce Enrile had planned a coup against Marcos but were discovered early, and, trapped in Camp Aguinaldo, asked the support of Philippine Constabulary Chief Fidel Ramos in nearby Camp Crame. When Roman Catholic Cardinal Jaime Sin learned about he situation, he called upon Philippine civilians, many of whom were preparing to protest the anomalous results of the 1986 Philippine presidential election to form a Human Barricade around the camps, effectively preventing Marcos' forces from taking the camps in a land assault but leaving the camps vulnerable to attack from the air. After determining that all his men were no longer willing to support Marcos in the aftermath of the election, Col. Antonio Sotelo defected with the entirety of the 15th Strike Wing, Philippine Air Force, landing 6 S-76 gunships, 2 rescue helicopters, and a utility BC-105 on the grounds of Ramos' headquarters at Camp Crame. Sotelo and his forces then later flew back to Villamor Air Base to disable six remaining UH-1 'Huey' helicopters which Marcos' forces could have used to attack the camps.  This encouraged even more AFP units to withdraw their support for the dictatorship.

1986–1990 Coup attempts

The following years remained hostile for the Philippines, a series of bloody coup attempts led by then-Col Gregorio Honasan of the Reform the Armed Forces Movement, involved thousands of renegade troops, including elite units from the army and marines, in a coordinated series of attacks on Malacanang and several major military camps in Manila and surrounding provinces, including Sangley and Villamor Air Base, using the T-28 aircraft for aerial assaults. President Corazon Aquino found it necessary to request United States support to put down the uprising. As a result, a large US special operations force was formed and named Operation Classic Resolve, as USAF F4 fighter aircraft stationed at Clark Air Base patrolled above rebel air bases, and two aircraft carriers were positioned off the Philippines. The US operation soon caused the coup to collapse. Additional US forces were then sent to secure the American embassy in Manila. The military uprisings resulted in an estimated US$1.5 billion loss to the Philippine Economy.

US Military departure from the Philippines
The Cold War Era has reached its endpoint as tensions between the two ideological rivals, the United States and the Soviet Union, have simmered down as a result of the dissolution of the latter and the massive change of political system among its allies.

The fate of the US military bases in the country was greatly affected by these circumstances, aside from the catastrophic eruption of Mount Pinatubo in 1991 which engulfed the installations with ash and lahar flows. The nearby Clark Air Base was eventually abandoned afterwards, while the Philippine Senate voted to reject a new treaty for Subic Naval Complex, its sister American installation in Zambales. This occurrence had effectively ended the century-old US military presence in the country, even as President Corazon Aquino tried to extend the lease agreement by calling a national referendum, leaving a security vacuum in the region and terminated the inflows of economic and military aid into the Philippines.

Contemporary Era

AFP modernization efforts and Asian Financial Crisis
The importance of territorial defense capability was highlighted in the public eye in 1995 when the AFP published photographs of Chinese structures on Mischief Reef in the Spratlys.

Initial attempts to improve the capabilities of the Armed Forces happened when a law was passed in the same year for the sale of redundant military installations and devote 35 percent of the proceeds for the AFP upgrades. Subsequently, the legislature passed the AFP Modernization Act. The law sought to modernize the AFP over a 15-year period, with minimum appropriation of 10-billion Pesos per year for the first five years, subject to increase in subsequent years of the program. The modernization fund was to be separate and distinct from the rest of the AFP budget.

However, the Asian Financial Crisis struck the region in 1997. This has greatly affected the AFP Modernization Program due to the government's austerity measures meant to turn the economy around after suffering from losses incurred during the financial crisis.

Several air assets acquired by the Philippine Air Force thru the original AFP Modernization Program of 1995 were the AW109 armed scout helicopters, and airlift assets like the Airbus C295 and CASA C212 Aviocar.

A decade of neglect

Since the retirement of the Northrop F-5s in September 2005 without a planned replacement, the Philippine Air Force was left without fighter jets. The PAF resorted to the Aermacchi S-211 trainer jets to fill the void left by the F-5's. These S-211's were later upgraded to light attack capability and used for air and sea patrol and also performed counter-insurgency operations from time to time. The only active fixed wing aircraft to fill the roles were the SF-260 trainers with light attack capability, the OV-10 Bronco light attack and reconnaissance aircraft and the AS-211 warriors (upgraded S-211).

South China Sea arbitration case and revised AFP Modernization Program
The incidents with Chinese presence in the South China Sea prompted the Philippines to proceed with formal measures while challenging the Chinese activities in some of the sea features in the disputed island chain. Hence, the South China Sea Arbitration Case was filed by the Philippines in 2013 at the International Tribunal for the Law of the Sea (ITLOS).

Reminiscent to what occurred in 1995, the Congress passed the Revised AFP Modernization Act of 2012, this was meant to replace the older AFP Modernization Act of 1995 signed during former Pres. Fidel V. Ramos’ term, when its 15-year program effectivity expired in 2010. Major air assets acquired in this new modernization program iteration are 12 FA-50 Light Fighters, while those programmed for future procurements are the Multi-Role Fighters and the Maritime Patrol Aircraft, among other equipment.

Flight Plan 2028
In response to regional strategic challenges and perceived internal weaknesses, the PAF has embarked on a transformation process to enhance its capabilities. Flight Plan 2028 is administered by the Air Force Strategy Management Office (AFSMO), and aims to:
Build the PAF capability to detect, identify, intercept and neutralize intrusions in the Philippine Air Defense Identification Zone (PADIZ) and the South China Sea (to the North and West of the archipelago) from Area Readiness 4 to Area Readiness 3 by 2022.
Build the PAF capability to detect, identify, intercept and neutralize intrusions into the entire Philippine territory from Area Readiness 3 to Area Readiness 1 by 2028;
The plan calls for a reorienting of the Philippine Air Force from a primarily internal security role to a territorial defence force. It will require substantial organisational, doctrinal, training, strategic and equipment transformation.

US-Philippine Enhanced Defence Cooperation Agreement
In April 2014, the Enhanced Defense Cooperation Agreement was signed by the representatives of the Philippine and US Governments, aimed at bolstering the military alliance of both countries. The agreement allows the United States to rotate troops into the Philippines for extended stays and allows the U.S. to build and operate temporary facilities on Philippine military bases for both American and Philippine forces' use.

Both parties agreed to determine the military installations across the Philippines as covered by the pact, including the former US Subic Bay Naval Base and Clark Air Base, as well as several locations on Cebu, Luzon, and Palawan.

As of 2016, four PAF bases and one Army camp have been determined by the United States and the Philippines to be utilized under the agreement. The Air Force Bases are Basa Air Base, Antonio Bautista Air Base, Benito Ebuen Air Base, and Lumbia Airfield.

Organization
The Philippine Air Force is commanded by the Chief of the Air Force, holding the rank of Lieutenant General, and is assisted by the Vice Chief of the Philippine Air Force, and the Chief of Air Staff, in charge of organizational and administrative matters, both holders of the rank of Major General. The Philippine Air Force consists of three tactical commands, three support commands, seven air wings including one separate search and rescue wing, one engineering brigade, one air control and warning wing, one air weather group and one special operations unit.

Tactical Commands and Air Wings 
The three Tactical Commands are in the direct control of the PAF Leadership while serving his function in the command chain of the AFP. These units are jointly reactivated and reorganized on July 21, 2017, while effectively replacing the 1st, 2nd, and 3rd Air Divisions as part of the PAF Flight Plan 2028.
Air Defense Command (ADC), Clark Air Base- responsible for overall air defense, tracking and interdiction of the PAF and the AFP.
5th Fighter Wing, Basa Air Base – it is responsible for fighter operations of the PAF. It replaced the Air Defense Wing after the two were reactivated to their original status in 2017.
7th Tactical Fighter (Bulldogs) Squadron – flies the KAI FA-50PH Fighting Eagle multi-role fighter aircraft.
105th Fighter Training (Blackjacks) Squadron – conducts jet qualification and training for future fighter-bound pilots. Flies the Aermacchi AS-211 jet training aircraft.
Other units:
580th Aircraft Control and Warning Wing, Wallace Air Station – it is responsible for operating air defense and surveillance radar systems, and command and control units of the PAF. It was reactivated on November 3, 2016, after being downgraded to a Group on April 1, 2005.
960th Air and Missile Defense Group- responsible for aerial and missile defense operations of the PAF.
Philippine Air Defense Control Center- the ADC's primary control center unit.
Direct Air Support Force- serves as the ADC's coordination and guidance unit in air support operations.
Air Mobility Command (AMC) - responsible for overall airlifts and aerial transport operations, including helicopter transport, VIP transport, and search and rescue (SAR) operations of the PAF and the AFP.
 205th Tactical Helicopter Wing, Benito Ebuen Air Base – It is responsible for conducting tactical helicopter operations and limited air support, in support of the PAF and AFP. The wing flies the Bell UH-1H Huey, Dornier-Bell UH-1D Huey, Bell 412EP, and S-70i Black Hawk combat utility helicopters.
206th Tactical Helicopter (Hornets) Squadron
207th Tactical Helicopter (Stingers) Squadron
208th Tactical Helicopter (Daggers) Squadron
210th Tactical Training Squadron
Support Unit:
450th Maintenance and Support Group
220th Airlift Wing, Benito Ebuen Air Base – It provides tactical airlift operations in support of the AFP. It is also responsible for temporarily conducting long range maritime patrol and air reconnaissance.
221st Airlift Squadron – flies the Airbus C-295M and Fokker F27 Friendship medium tactical transport aircraft
222nd Airlift Squadron – flies the Lockheed C-130B/H/T Hercules heavy tactical transport aircraft
223rd Airlift Squadron – flies the GAF N-22B/C Nomad and EADS-IAe NC-212i light tactical transport aircraft
228th Transport Crew and Training Squadron
Support Unit:
 470th Maintenance Support Group
 250th Presidential Airlift Wing, Villamor Air Base – It provides air transportation to the President of the Philippines, immediate members of presidential family, the Vice President of the Philippines and their immediate family members, heads of states, state guests, and very very important persons (VVIP). The unit is also attached to the Presidential Security Group (PSG).
251st Presidential Airlift Squadron – flies the Airbus C-295M, Fokker F27 Friendship and Fokker F28 Fellowship VVIP aircraft.
252nd Presidential Airlift Squadron – flies the Bell 412EP/HP VVIP helicopters.
Support Unit:
 480th Maintenance and Supply Group
505th Search and Rescue Group, Villamor Air Base – It is responsible for air search and rescue operations in support of the AFP and civilian agencies. The unit flies the Bell 205A, UH-1H Huey II, Bell UH-1H Super Huey, and the PZL W-3A Sokół as SAR helicopters, and the Sikorsky S-76A and S-70 as Air Ambulances.
 5051st Search and Rescue Squadron
 5052nd Search and Rescue Squadron
560th Air Base Group
Air Combat Command (ACC, formerly Tactical Operations Command), Edwin Andrews Air Base - responsible for overall air to ground operations, including attack and ground support operations, and special forces missions.
 15th Strike Wing, Danilo Atienza Air Base – It is responsible for providing combat air support to surface forces of the AFP.
 16th Attack (Eagles) Squadron – flies the Embraer A-29B Super Tucano and Aermacchi SF-260TP Warrior
 17th Attack (Jaguars) Squadron – flies the Rockwell OV-10A/C Bronco
 18th Attack (Falcons) Squadron – flies the Leonardo AW109E Power and the TAI/AgustaWestland T129 ATAK
 19th Composite Tactical Training (Griffins) Squadron
 20th Attack (Firebirds) Squadron – flies the McDonnell Douglas MD-520MG Defender and the AH-1F Cobra
25th Composite Attack (Lobos) Squadron
 Support Units:
 590th Air Base Group
 460th Maintenance and Supply Group
 710th Special Operations Wing, Colonel Ernesto Rabina Air Base – It is responsible for conducting special operations, counter terrorism, and defense of PAF bases and facilities.
 720th Special Operations Group – based in Villamor Air Base, Pasay
 730th Combat Group
 740th Combat Group – based in Fernando Air Base, Lipa
 750th Combat Group – based in Camp General Emilio Aguinaldo, Quezon City
 760th Combat Group
 770th Special Operations Combat Support Group – based in Clark Air Base, Angeles City
 772nd Explosive Ordnance Disposal Squadron
 773rd K-9 Squadron
 780th Ground Based Air Defense Group
530th Air Base Group

Support commands
The three Support Commands are in charge for the overall combat, logistics, education, training, doctrine development, reservist management and administrative support in the PAF's operations.
Air Logistics Command (ALC), Clark Air Base
410th Maintenance Wing
420th Supply Wing
 Air Force Research & Development Center
 600th Air Base Group
Air Education, Training, and Doctrine Command (AETDC), Basa Air Base
 Aviation and Excellence Nexus (PAF ALEN)
 Air Warfare Center
 PAF Basic Military School
 PAF Flying School
 PAF Logistics Training Center
 PAF Officer School 
 PAF Officer Candidate School 
 PAF Non Commissioned Officer School
 PAF Technical and Specialization School
 Training Development Center
 440th Aircraft Maintenance Group
 550th Air Base Group
Air Force Reserve Command (AFRC), Villamor Air Base

Separate units
 300th Air Intelligence and Security Wing, Antonio Bautista Air Base – responsible for conducting aerial surveillance, intelligence gathering, and maritime patrol using air and ground assets.
 3031st Unmanned Aerial Reconnaissance Squadron – flies the ScanEagle 2, Elbit Hermes 900 and Elbit Hermes 450 UAVs.
 3032nd Aerial Reconnaissance Squadron – flies the Cessna 208B Grand Caravan ISR and Turbo Commander 690A ISR aircraft, also provide ISR equipment operators for SABIR-equipped C-130T Hercules when configured for Maritime Patrol Aircraft missions.
 355th Aviation Engineering Wing, Clark Air Base – the unit is tasked to provide general engineering support, including construction, repair, rehabilitation and maintenance of PAF aerodrome facilities and utilities.
 900th Air Force Weather Group -  It is responsible for weather information, observation, reporting, and cloud seeding operations.

Aerobatic teams

The Philippine Air Force had a number of aerobatic teams among which the PAF Blue Diamonds was the first to be founded, and was one of the oldest formal aerobatics teams in the world. The proceeding units listed are at inactive status due to the retirement of their aircraft, most notably the Northrop F-5 Freedom Fighters.
Blue Diamonds – 5th Fighter Wing, Air Defense Command
Red Aces – 7th Tactical Fighter Squadron, 5th FW
Golden Sabres – 9th Tactical Fighter Squadron, 5th FW (merged with the Red Aces in 1973)
  Bubuyogs – PAF Helicopter Precision Demonstration Team, 205th Tactical Helicopter Wing

Rank structure

Officers

Enlisted

Bases
The Philippine Air Force has nine major air bases and several radar, communications, and support facilities located throughout the archipelago. Shared facilities with commercial airports being used as detachments by the Tactical Operations Command were not included here.

Equipment 

The Philippine Air Force has made use of its existing equipment to fulfill its mandate while modernization projects are underway. The Republic Act No. 7898 declares the policy of the State to modernize the military to a level where it can effectively and fully perform its constitutional mandate to uphold the sovereignty and preserve the patrimony of the republic. The law, as amended, has set conditions that should be satisfied when the defense department procures major equipment and weapon systems for the air force.

These are acquisition projects of the government that have been signed and awaiting delivery for the modernization of the air force.
 1 C-130H cargo aircraft on order from the United States.
 3 Lockheed Martin C-130J Super Hercules on order under the Additional Air Transport Capability Project worth Php. 22.2 billion.
 2 ATR 72 MP on order under the procurement of the Long Range Patrol Aircraft worth Php 5.976 billion.
 2 TAI/AgustaWestland T129 ATAK attack helicopters have been delivered while four (4) more units are awaiting delivery under a Php 13.8 billion project. 
 32 S-70i Black Hawk combat helicopters are on order for Php 32 billion from Poland
 The defense department has purchased the Rafael SPYDER defence system for Php 6 billion. One (1) battery plus the associated radar systems, command and control, support vehicles, and ammunition set to be delivered in 2024.
 Three fixed radar systems and one mobile radar system have been ordered from Japan for air surveillance with a tentative delivery in 2022.

References

External links

History of the Philippine Air Force
The Emergence of the Philippine Air Force (PhAF or Hukbong Himpapawid Ng Pilipinas)
PAF page at Scramble
Papers of William Lecel Lee, former Technical Advisor to the Philippine Air Force and Chief of the Constabulary Air Corps, Dwight D. Eisenhower Presidential Library

 
Military units and formations established in 1947
1947 establishments in the Philippines